Unuttum (I've Forgotten) is the second studio album by Turkish singer Demet Akalın. It was released om 30 May 2003 by Peker Müzik. All of the new songs in the album were written by Ersay Üner and a number of cover versions performed by Akalın were included in it as well. Three music videos were made for the album's lead single, "Unuttum", as well as the songs "Gazete" and "Allahından Bul".

Track listing

Personnel 
Credits adapted from Discogs.

Music

Production 
 Executive Production: Ersay Üner, Demet Akalın
 Production: Ersay Üner, Demet Akalın
 Mixing: Serkan Kula, Arzu Aslan
 Mastering: Cem Büyükuzun

Release history

References

Demet Akalın albums
2003 albums